State Route 121 (SR 121) was a  state highway entirely in Tallapoosa County in the east-central part of the U.S. state of Alabama. The southern terminus of the highway was at U.S. Route 280 (US 280) in Camp Hill. The northern terminus of the route was at its intersection with SR 50, also in Camp Hill.

Route description
State Route 121 began at US 280 (now old US 280) in Camp Hill, heading towards downtown Camp Hill. At downtown Camp Hill there was the town's police station, library, the old post office, and some abandoned buildings. SR 121 then ended at SR 50 in Camp Hill.

History
SR 121 was established in the 1970s and decommissioned three decades later in September 2005 because of the US 280 Bypass opening.

Major intersections

References

External links

121
Transportation in Tallapoosa County, Alabama
Transportation in Camp Hill, Alabama
State highways in the United States shorter than one mile